In 2006, Romanian Television (Televiziunea Română, TVR) conducted a vote to determine whom the general public considered the 100 Greatest Romanians of all time, in a version of the British TV show 100 Greatest Britons. The resulting series, Great Romanians, included individual programmes on the top ten, with viewers having further opportunities to vote after each programme. It concluded with a debate. On 21 October, TVR announced that the "greatest Romanian of all time" according to the voting was Stephen the Great.

Top 10

Full list
Stephen the Great
Carol I
Mihai Eminescu 
Mihai Viteazul 
Richard Wurmbrand 
Ion Antonescu
Mircea Eliade
Alexandru Ioan Cuza 
Constantin Brâncuși 
Nadia Comăneci
Nicolae Ceaușescu (1918–1989) – last communist dictator of Romania
Vlad Țepeș (1431–1476) – Prince of Wallachia
Gigi Becali (1958– ) – politician and businessman, football club owner
Henri Coandă (1886–1972) – inventor and aerodynamics pioneer
Gheorghe Hagi (1965– ) – football player
Ion Luca Caragiale (1852–1912) – playwright and short story writer
Nicolae Iorga (1871–1940) – historian, writer, and politician
Constantin Brâncoveanu (1654–1714) – Prince of Wallachia
George Enescu (1881–1955) – composer and musician
Gregorian Bivolaru (1952– ) – founder of MISA yoga organization
Mirel Rădoi (1980– ) – football player
Corneliu Zelea Codreanu (1899–1938) – founder of the Legionary Movement, the main Romanian fascist movement during the 1930s
Nicolae Titulescu (1882–1941) – diplomat, president of the League of Nations
Ferdinand I of Romania (1865–1927) – King of Romania during World War I, who oversaw the creation of "Greater Romania"
Mihai I (1921–2017) – last King of Romania before communist period
Decebalus (87–106) – last King of Dacia before Roman conquest
Traian Băsescu (1951–) – politician, former President of Romania
Gheorghe Mureșan (1971– ) – NBA basketball player
Ion I. C. Brătianu (1864–1927) – liberal politician, Prime Minister of Romania for five terms
Răzvan Lucescu (1969– ) football player and football club manager
Nicolae Paulescu (1869–1931) – physiologist, one of the scientists who developed diabetes treatment with insulin
Iuliu Maniu (1873–1953) – politician, fought for the national rights of the Romanians of Transylvania
Iuliu Hossu (1885–1970) – Greek-Catholic bishop, victim of the communist regime
Emil Cioran (1911–1995) – philosopher, writer, and essayist
Avram Iancu (1824–1872) – leader of the 1848 Romanian revolution in Transylvania
Burebista (? – 44 BC) – King of Dacia
Marie of Romania (1875–1938) – Queen of Romania
Petre Țuțea (1902–1991) – philosopher, Christian-fascist intellectual, victim of the communist regime
Corneliu Coposu (1914–1995) – liberal politician, victim of the communist regime
Aurel Vlaicu (1882–1913) – inventor, aviation pioneer
Iosif Trifa (1888–1938) – Eastern Orthodox priest, founder of the "Oastea Domnului" ("Lord's Army") Christian organisation
Nichita Stănescu (1933–1983) – poet and essayist
Ion Creangă (1837–1889) – writer
Mădalina Manole (1967–2010) – pop singer
Corneliu Vadim Tudor (1949–2015) – ultranationalist politician, writer and journalist; founder and leader of the Greater Romania Party
Traian Vuia (1872–1950) – inventor, aviation pioneer
Lucian Blaga (1895–1961) – poet, playwright, and philosopher
George Emil Palade (1912–2008) – cell biologist, winner of the Nobel Prize for Physiology or Medicine (1974)
Ana Aslan (1897–1988) – biologist, physician and inventor, the author of essential research in gerontology 
Adrian Mutu (1979– ) – football player
Florin Piersic (1936– ) – theater and film actor
Mihail Kogălniceanu (1817–1891) – politician and historian, first Prime Minister of the United Principalities of Romania
Iancsi Korossy (1926–2013) – jazz pianist
Dimitrie Cantemir (1673–1723) – Prince of Moldavia and prolific man of letters
Ilie Năstase (1946– ) – tennis player
Gheorghe Zamfir (1941– ) – musician, pan flute player
Gică Petrescu (1915–2006) – musician, folk and pop music composer and singer
Elisabeta Rizea (1912–2003) – anti-communist partisan
Bulă (fictional) – a stock character of Romanian jokes of the communist era
Amza Pellea (1931–1983) – theater and film actor
Matei Corvin  (1443 (?) – 1490) – King of Hungary
Mircea cel Bătrân (1355–1418) – Prince of Wallachia
Titu Maiorescu (1840–1917) – literary critic and politician
Toma Caragiu (1925–1977) – theater and film actor
Mihai Trăistariu (1979– ) – pop singer
Andreea Marin (1974– ) – TV show host
Emil Racoviță (1868–1947) – biologist, co-founder of biospeleology and explorer of Antarctica
Victor Babeș (1854–1926) – biologist and early bacteriologist, one of the founders of microbiology
Nicolae Bălcescu (1819–1852) – leader of the 1848 Wallachian Revolution
Horia-Roman Patapievici (1957– ) – writer and essayist
Ion Iliescu (1930– ) – first President of Romania after the 1989 revolution
Marin Preda (1922–1980) – novelist
Eugen Ionescu (1909–1994) – playwright, one of the initiators of the theatre of the absurd
Dumitru Stăniloae (1903–1993) – Eastern Orthodox priest and theologian
Alexandru Todea (1905–2002) – Greek-Catholic bishop, victim of the communist regime
Tudor Gheorghe (1945– ) – singer and theater actor
Ion Țiriac (1939– ) – tennis player and businessman
Ilie Cleopa (1912–1998) – Eastern Orthodox archimandrite
Arsenie Boca (1910–1989) – Eastern Orthodox priest and theologian, victim of the communist regime
Bănel Nicoliță (1985– ) – football player 
Dumitru Cornilescu (1891–1975) – Eastern Orthodox, then Protestant priest, translated the Bible into Romanian in 1921
Grigore Moisil (1906–1973) – mathematician and computing pioneer
Claudiu Niculescu (1976– ) – football player 
Florentin Petre (1976– ) – football player 
Marius Moga (1981– ) – pop music composer and singer 
Nicolae Steinhardt (1912–1989) – writer
Laura Stoica (1967–2006) – pop and rock singer, composer and actress 
Cătălin Hâldan (1976–2000) – football player
Anghel Saligny (1854–1925) – public works, chiefly railway engineer
Ivan Patzaichin (1949–2021) – flatwater canoer who won seven Olympic medals
Maria Tănase (1913–1963) – traditional and popular music singer
Sergiu Nicolaescu (1930–2013) – film director, actor and politician
Octavian Paler (1926–2007) – essayist
The Unknown Soldier – the Romanian soldier in the national Tomb of the Unknown Soldier
Ciprian Porumbescu (1853–1883) – composer
Nicolae Covaci (1947– ) – founder of the Phoenix rock band
Dumitru Prunariu (1952– ) – first Romanian cosmonaut
Iancu de Hunedoara (c. 1387 – 1456) – Voivode of Transylvania, captain-general and regent of the Kingdom of Hungary
Constantin Noica (1909–1987) – philosopher and essayist
Badea Cârțan (1849–1911) – a shepherd who fought for the independence of the Romanians of Transylvania (then under Hungarian rule inside Austria-Hungary)

Other editions

Other countries have produced similar shows; see Greatest Britons spin-offs

References

External links
mariromani.ro

Greatest Nationals
Lists of Romanian people
Romanian Television
Romanian television series